Thomas County is the name of several counties in the United States:

 Thomas County, Georgia
 Thomas County, Kansas
 Thomas County, Nebraska